Iran–United Kingdom relations are the bilateral relations between the United Kingdom and Iran. Iran, which was called Persia by the West before 1935, has had political relations with England since the late Ilkhanate period (13th century) when King Edward I of England sent Geoffrey of Langley to the Ilkhanid court to seek an alliance.

Until the early nineteenth century, Iran was a remote and legendary country for Britain, so much so that the European country never seriously established a diplomatic center, such as a consulate or embassy.  By the middle of the nineteenth century, Iran grew in importance as a buffer state to the United Kingdom's dominion over India. Britain fostered conflict between Iran and Afghanistan as a means of forestalling an Afghan invasion of India.

History of Anglo–Iranian relations

Safavid era
In the year 1553, King Edward VI of England hired the wealthy merchant and explorer, Sebastian Cabot to develop a semi-profitable trading company. He was given two ships that sailed towards the port city of Arkhangelsk. The captain of one of those ships was Cpt. Richard Chancellor, who successfully reached the northern city. From there, Sebastian Cabot and his envoy traveled towards the Russian city of Moscow with a business proposition for the Grand Duke Ivan IV the Terrible. When it was accepted, the Moscow Trading Company came into existence.  South of the Moscow Trading Company Headquarters was the wealthy realm of the Safavid Empire. The company started sending envoys during the reign of Shah Tahmasp I during the first years in business. Anthony Jenkinson was one of the first leaders of these envoys. In total, there were six visits and the last one was in June 1579 during the reign of Shah Mohammad Khodabandeh led by Arthur Edwards. But at the time the company's envoys reached the royal court in Qazvin, the Shah was busy protecting his borders from his arch rival, the Ottoman Empire. In order to attain the wealth of the country, the company penetrated successfully into the bazaars and dispatched more envoys.

In 1597, as Abbas I of Safavid sought to establish an alliance against his arch rival, the Ottomans, he received Robert Shirley, Anthony Shirley, and a group of 26 English envoys in Qazvin. The English delegation, also well aware of the Ottoman threat, were more than glad to have Persia as an ally against the Ottoman threat. Shah Abbas warmly received the delegation and took them as his guests with him to Isfahan, his new capital.

Soon, the Shirley brothers were appointed by the Shah to organize and modernize the royal cavalry and train the army (most notably the elite "Ghulam" slave soldiers, consisting of en masse deported and imported Circassians, Georgians, and Armenians and other Caucasians by the Shahs). The effects of these modernizations proved to be highly successful, as from then on the Safavids proved to be an equal force against their arch rival, immediately crushing them in the first war to come (Ottoman–Safavid War (1603–1618)) and all other Safavid wars to come. Many more events followed, including the debut of the British East India Company into Persia, and the establishment of trade routes for silk though Jask in the Strait of Hormuz in 1616. It was from here where the likes of Sir John Malcolm later gained influence into the Qajarid throne.

Qajar era

Anglo-Persian relations picked up momentum as a weakened Safavid empire, after the short-lived revival by the military genius Nader Shah (r. 1736-1747), eventually gave way to the Qajarid dynasty, which was quickly absorbed into domestic turmoil and rivalry, while competing colonial powers rapidly sought a stable foothold in the region. While the Portuguese, British, and Dutch, competed for the south and southeast of Persia in the Persian Gulf, Imperial Russia was largely left unchallenged in the north as it plunged southward to establish dominance in Persia's northern territories.

Plagued with internal politics and incompetence, the Qajarid government found itself fast after their ascendancy incapable of rising to the numerous complex foreign political challenges at the doorsteps of Persia.

During the monarchy of Fath Ali Shah, Sir John Malcolm, Sir Harford Jones-Brydges, 1st Baronet, Allen Lindsay, Henry Pottinger, Charles Christie, Sir Henry Rawlinson, Harold Nicolson, Sir John McNeill, Edmund Ironside, and James Morier were some of the British elite closely involved with Persian politics. Allen Lindsay was even appointed as a general in Abbas Mirza's army.

A weakened and bankrupted royal court under Fath Ali Shah was forced to sign the Treaty of Gulistan in 1813, followed by the Treaty of Turkmenchay after efforts by Abbas Mirza failed to secure Persia's northern front against Imperial Russia. The treaties were prepared by the Sir Gore Ouseley with the aid of the British Foreign Office in London. Sir Gore Ouseley was the younger brother of the British orientalist William Ouseley, who served as secretary to the British ambassador in Persia.

In fact, Iran's current southern and eastern boundaries were determined by none other than the British during the Anglo-Persian War (1856 to 1857). After repelling Nasereddin Shah's attack in Herat in 1857, the British government assigned Frederic John Goldsmid of the Indo-European Telegraph Department to determine the borders between Persia and India during the 1860s.

In 1872, the Shah signed an agreement with Baron Julius de Reuter, which George Nathaniel Curzon called "The most complete and extraordinary surrender of the entire industrial resources of a kingdom into foreign hands that has ever been dreamed of".

The Reuter Concession was immediately denounced by all ranks of businessmen, clergy, and nationalists of Persia, and the concession was quickly forced into cancellation.

Similarly, the "Tobacco fatwa", decreed by Grand Ayatollah Mirza Hassan Shirazi was an incident which raised popular resentment against the British presence in Persia in lieu of a diplomatically decapitated and apathetic Qajar throne. Concessions such as this and the 70-year contract of Persian railways to be operated by British businessmen such as Baron de Reuter became increasingly visible. The visibility became particularly pronounced after the discovery of oil in Masjed Soleiman in 1909 and the establishment of the Anglo-Iranian Oil Company and the "D'Arcy Concession".

By the end of the 19th century, Britain's dominance became so pronounced that Khuzestan, Bushehr, and a host of other cities in southern Persia were occupied by Great Britain, and the central government in Tehran was left with no power to even select its own ministers without the approval of the Anglo-Russian consulates. Morgan Shuster, for example, had to resign under tremendous British and Russian pressure on the royal court. Shuster's book The Strangling of Persia is a recount of the details of these events, a harsh criticism of Britain and Imperial Russia.

Pahlavi era
Of the public outcry against the inability of the Persian throne to maintain its political and economic independence from Great Britain and Imperial Russia in the face of events such as the Anglo-Russian Convention of 1907 and "the 1919 treaty", one result was the Persian Constitutional Revolution, which eventually resulted in the fall of the Qajar dynasty.

The great tremor of the Persian political landscape occurred when the involvement of General Edmund Ironside eventually led to the rise of Reza Shah Pahlavi in the 1920s. The popular view that the British were involved in the 1921 coup was noted as early as March 1921 by the American embassy and relayed to the Iran desk at the Foreign Office. A British Embassy report from 1932 concedes that the British put Reza Shah "on the throne".

After his establishing of power and strengthening of the central government, Rezā Khan quickly put an end to the autonomous activities of the British-backed Sheikh Khazal in the south. London withdrew its support of Khaz'al in favor of Rezā Shāh.

A novel chapter in Anglo-Iranian relations had begun when Iran canceled its capitulation agreements with foreign powers in 1928. Iran's success in revoking the capitulation treaties, and the failure of the Anglo-Iranian Agreement of 1919 earlier, led to intense diplomatic efforts by the British government to regularize relations between the two countries on a treaty basis. On the Iranian side negotiations on the widest range of issues were conducted by Abdolhossein Teymourtash, the Minister of Court from 1925 to 1932, and Iran's nominal Minister of Foreign Affairs during the period.

The ire of the British Government was raised, however, by Persian diplomatic claims to the oil-rich regions of the Greater and Lesser Tunbs islands, Abu Musa and Bahrain in the Persian Gulf region. On the economic front, on the other hand, Iran's pressures to rescind the monopoly rights of the British-owned Imperial Bank of Persia to issue banknotes in Iran, the Iranian Trade Monopoly Law of 1928, and prohibitions whereby the British Government and Anglo-Persian Oil Company ("APOC") were no longer permitted to enter into direct agreements with their client tribes, as had been the case in the past, did little to satisfy British expectations. The cumulative impact of these demands on the British Government was well expressed by Sir Robert Clive, Britain's Minister to Tehran, who in 1931 noted in a report to the Foreign Office "There are indications, indeed that their present policy is to see how far they can push us in the way of concessions, and I feel we shall never re-establish our waning prestige or even be able to treat the Persian government on equal terms, until we are in a position to call a halt".

Despite the enormous volume of correspondence and protracted negotiations that took place between the two countries on the widest array of issues, on the Iranian side, Teymourtash conducted these negotiations single-handedly “without so much as a secretary to keep his papers in order”, according to one scholar. Resolution of all outstanding differences eluded a speedy resolution, however, given the reality that on the British side progress proved tedious due to the need to consult many government departments with differing interests and jurisdictions.

The most intractable challenge, however, proved to be Iran's assiduous efforts to revise the terms whereby the APOC retained near monopoly control over the oil industry in Iran as a result of the concession granted to William Knox D'Arcy in 1901 by the Qajar King of the period. "What Persians felt", Teymourtash would explain to his British counterparts in 1928, "was that an industry had been developed on their own soil in which they had no real share".

Complicating matters further, and ensuring that such demands would in due course set Iran on a collision course with the British Government was the reality that pursuant to a 1914 Act of the British Parliament, an initiative championed by Winston Churchill in his capacity as First Lord of the Admiralty, led the British Government to be granted a majority fifty-three percent ownership of the shares of APOC. The decision was adopted during World War I to ensure the British Government would gain a critical foothold in Iranian affairs so as to protect the flow of oil from Iran due to its critical importance to the operation of the Royal Navy during the war effort. By the 1920s APOC's extensive installations and pipelines in Khuzestan and its refinery in Abadan meant that the company's operations in Iran had led to the creation of the greatest industrial complex in the Middle East.

The attempt to revise the terms of the oil concession on a more favorable basis for Iran led to protracted negotiations that took place in Tehran, Lausanne, London and Paris between Teymourtash and the Chairman of APOC, Sir John Cadman, spanning the years from 1928 to 1932. The overarching argument for revisiting the terms of the D'Arcy Agreement on the Iranian side was that its national wealth was being squandered by a concession that was granted in 1901 by a previous non-constitutional government forced to agree to inequitable terms under duress.

However, despite much progress, Rezā Shāh Pahlavi was soon to assert his authority by dramatically inserting himself into the negotiations. The Monarch attended a meeting of the Council of Ministers in November 1932, and after publicly rebuking Teymourtash for his failure to secure an agreement, dictated a letter to cabinet canceling the D'Arcy Agreement. The Iranian Government notified APOC that it would cease further negotiations and demanded cancellation of the D'Arcy concession. Rejecting the cancellation, the British government espoused the claim on behalf of APOC and brought the dispute before the Permanent Court of International Justice at The Hague, asserting that it regarded itself "as entitled to take all such measures as the situation may demand for the Company's protection." At this point, Hassan Taqizadeh, the new Iranian minister to have been entrusted the task of assuming responsibility for the oil dossier, was to intimate to the British that the cancellation was simply meant to expedite negotiations and that it would constitute political suicide for Iran to withdraw from negotiations.

Rezā Shāh was removed from power abruptly during the Anglo-Soviet invasion of Iran during World War II. The new Shah, Crown Prince Mohammad Reza Pahlavi, signed a Tripartite Treaty Alliance with Britain and the Soviet Union in January 1942, to aid in the allied war effort in a non-military way.

In 1951, the Iranians nationalized the oil under the leadership of democratically elected prime minister Mohammad Mosaddegh. This caused a lot of tension between Iran and the UK.

According to the book All the Shah's Men, the British tried to convince Harry S. Truman to join their campaign against Iran. However, it was only when Dwight Eisenhower became the president that British succeeded in convincing U.S. to join their plot. In order to convince the Eisenhower administration Woodhouse shaped his appeal around the rhetoric of anti-communism. They pointed out the Tudeh party could take control of Iran. Eventually British and CIA created a plan code-named Operation Ajax to overthrow the democratically elected Mosaddegh. The coup was performed by Central Intelligence Agency field commander Kermit Roosevelt Jr. (grandson of Theodore Roosevelt).

After the coup, scores of Iranian political activists from the National and Communist parties were jailed or killed. This coup only added to the deep mistrust towards the British in Iran. It has since been very common in Iranian culture to mistrust British government; a good example is the character of Uncle in the television show My Uncle Napoleon.

The end of World War II brought the start of American dominance in Iran's political arena, and with an anti-Soviet Cold War brewing, the United States quickly moved to convert Iran into an anti-communist bloc, thus considerably diminishing Britain's influence on Iran for years to come. Operation Ajax and the fall of Prime Minister Mosaddegh was perhaps the last of the large British involvements in Iranian politics in the Pahlavi era.
The Shah of Iran Mohammad Reza Pahlavi paid a state visit to the United Kingdom in May 1959. Queen Elizabeth II of the United Kingdom paid a state visit to Iran in March 1961.

The British forces began to withdraw from the Gulf in 1968. This was done, quite literally, out of pure economic considerations. The British simply could not afford the costs of administration. (See also East of Suez). As part of this policy, in 1971, the then British government decided not to support the Shah and eventually, the patronage of the United Kingdom ended, and consequently, this role was filled by the US.

The Islamic Republic

On 30 April 1980, the Iranian Embassy in London was taken over by a six-man terrorist team holding the building for six days until the hostages were rescued by a raid by the SAS. After the Revolution of Iran in 1979, Britain suspended all diplomatic relations with Iran. Britain did not have an embassy until it was reopened in 1988.

During the Iran–Iraq War, Saddam Hussein acquired metal tubes from firms in the United Kingdom, intended for the Project Babylon supergun. All were intercepted by customs and excise and none ever reached Iraq. The suppliers were under the impression that their tubes would have been used in a pipeline project.

A year after the re-establishment of the British embassy in Tehran, Ayatollah Khomeini issued a fatwa ordering Muslims across the world to kill British author Salman Rushdie. Diplomatic ties with London were broken off only to be resumed at a chargé d'affaires level in 1990.

Relations normalized in 1997 during President Mohammad Khatami's reformist administration, and Jack Straw became the first high-ranking British politician to visit Tehran in 2001 since the revolution.

Relations suffered a setback in 2002 when David Reddaway was rejected by Tehran as London's ambassador, on charges of being a spy, and further deteriorated two years later when Iran seized eight British sailors in Arvand River near the border with Iraq. The sailors were pardoned and attended a goodbye ceremony with President Ahmadinejad shortly after they were released.

In February 2004, following the earthquake in Bam, Prince Charles and then President Mohammad Khatami visited the city.

On 28 November 2011 Iran downgraded its relations with Britain due to new sanctions put in place by the UK. The next day a band of students and Basiji attacked the UK embassy compound in Tehran, damaging property and driving the embassy staff away. On 30 November 2011, in response to the attack, the UK closed its embassy in Tehran and ordered the Iranian embassy in London closed.

According to a 2013 BBC World Service poll, only 5% of British people view Iran's influence positively, with 84% expressing a negative view. According to a 2012 Pew Global Attitudes Survey, 16% of British people viewed Iran favorably, compared to 68% which viewed it unfavorably; 91% of British people oppose Iranian acquisition of nuclear weapons and 79% approve of "tougher sanctions" on Iran, while 51% of British people support use of military force to prevent Iran from developing nuclear weapons.

From July 2012 until October 2013, British interests in Iran were maintained by the Swedish embassy in Tehran  while Iranian interests in the United Kingdom were maintained by the Omani embassy in London.

On July 2013, it was announced that the UK would consider opening better relations with Iran "step-by-step" following the election of President Hassan Rouhani.

On October 8, 2013, Britain and Iran announced that they would each appoint a chargé d'affaires to work toward resuming full diplomatic relations.

On February 20, 2014, the Iranian Embassy in London was restored and the two countries agreed to restart diplomatic relations.
On August 23, 2015, the British Embassy in Tehran officially reopened.

Current relations

Trade
The first Persian Ambassador to the United Kingdom was Mirza Albohassan Khan Ilchi Kabir.

The Herald Tribune on 22 January 2006 reported a rise in British exports to Iran from £296 million in 2000 to £443.8 million in 2004. A spokesperson for UK Trade and Investment was quoted saying that "Iran has become more attractive because it now pursues a more liberal economic policy". As of 2009, the total assets frozen in Britain under the EU (European Union) and UN sanctions against Iran are approximately £976m ($1.64 billion). In November 2011, Britain severed all ties with Iranian banks as part of a package of sanctions from the US, UK and Canada aimed at confronting Tehran’s nuclear programme.

Political tension
The confrontation between the United States–European Union pact on one side and Iran on the other over Iran's nuclear program also continues to develop, remaining a serious obstacle in the improvement of Tehran–London ties.

A confidential letter by UK diplomat John Sawers to French, German and US diplomats, dated 16 March 2006, twice referred to the intention to have the United Nations Security Council refer to Chapter VII of the United Nations Charter in order to put pressure on Iran. Chapter VII describes the Security Council's power to authorize economic, diplomatic, and military sanctions, as well as the use of military force, to resolve disputes.

The Sunday Telegraph reported that a secret, high-level meeting would take place on 3 April 2006 between the UK government and military chiefs regarding plans to attack Iran. The Telegraph cited "a senior Foreign Office source" saying that "The belief in some areas of Whitehall is that an attack is now all but inevitable. There will be no invasion of Iran but the nuclear sites will be destroyed." The BBC reported a denial that the meeting would take place, but no denial of the alleged themes of the meeting, by the UK Ministry of Defence, and that "there is well sourced and persistent speculation that American covert activities aimed at Iran are already underway".

2004 Iranian seizure of Royal Navy personnel

On 21 June 2004, eight sailors and Royal Marines were seized by forces of the Revolutionary Guards' Navy while training Iraqi river patrol personnel in the Persian Gulf.

2007 Iranian seizure of Royal Navy personnel

On 23 March 2007 fifteen Royal Navy personnel were seized by the naval forces of the Iranian Revolutionary Guard for allegedly having strayed into Iranian waters. Eight sailors and seven Royal Marines on two boats from HMS Cornwall were detained at 10:30 local time by six Guard boats of the IRGC Navy. They were subsequently taken to Tehran. Iran reported that the sailors are well. About 200 students targeted the British Embassy on 1 April 2007 calling for the expulsion of the country's ambassador because of the standoff over Iran's capture of 15 British sailors and marines. The protesters chanted "Death to Britain" and "Death to America". Speculation on the Iranians' motivations for this action ran rampant; with the Iranians under tremendous pressure on a number of fronts from the United States, the Revolutionary Guard Corps could have been responding to any one of a number of perceived threats.

On 3 April 2007, Prime Minister Tony Blair advised that "the next 48 hours will be critical" in defusing the crisis. At approximately 1:20 PM GMT, Iran's president announced that the 8 sailors would be 'pardoned'. The following day, he announced all 15 British personnel would be released immediately "in celebration of the Prophet's birthday and Easter."

Arms sales
Despite the political pressure and sanctions, a probe by customs officers suggests that at least seven British arms dealers have been supplying the Iranian air force, its elite Revolutionary Guard Corps, and the country's controversial nuclear ambitions. A UK businessman was caught smuggling components for use in guided missiles through a front company that proved to be the Iranian Ministry of Defence. Another case involves a group that included several Britons which, investigators alleged, attempted to export components intended to enhance the performance of Iranian aircraft. Other examples involve a British millionaire arms dealer caught trading machine-guns used by the SAS and capable of firing 800 rounds a minute with a Tehran-based weapons supplier.

Gholhak Garden
In 2006 a dispute about the ownership of Gholhak Garden, a large British diplomatic compound in northern Tehran was raised in the Iranian Parliament when 162 MPs wrote to the speaker. The British Embassy have occupied the site since at least 1934 and assert that they have legal ownership but the issue was raised again in 2007 when a group of MPs claimed that the ownership papers for the site were unlawful under the laws extant in 1934. In July 2007 a conference was held to discuss the ownership of the compound but was not attended by the British side.

Asylum
On 14 March 2008, Britain said it would reconsider the asylum application of a gay Iranian teenager who claims he will be persecuted if he is returned home. He had fled to the Netherlands and sought asylum there; however, the Dutch government turned him down, saying the case should be dealt with in Britain, where he first applied.

Escalating war talk
As talk of strikes and counter-strikes in relation to war talk between the United States-Israel-Iran trio heated up in 2008, a senior Iranian official suggested his regime should target London to deter such an attack. The head of the Europe and US Department in the Iranian Foreign Ministry, Wahid Karimi, said an attack on London could deter the US from attacking Tehran. He said: "The most appropriate means of deterrence that Iran has, in addition to a retaliatory operation in the [Persian Gulf] region, is to take action against London." He also suggested a propensity to attack could arise from a "usually adventuresome" second term presidency. He said: "US presidents are usually adventuresome in their second terms... [Richard] Nixon, disgraced by the Watergate scandal; [Ronald] Reagan, with the 'Irangate' adventure; [and Bill] Clinton, with Monica Lewinsky—and perhaps George Bush, the sitting president, will create a scandal connected to Iran's legitimate nuclear activity so as not to be left behind." His speculation led him to suggest a clash could occur between the 2008 U.S. presidential elections and by the time the new president enters office in January 2009. "In the worst-case scenario, George Bush may perhaps persuade the president-elect to carry out an ill-conceived operation against Iran, prior to January 20, 2009—that is, before the regime is handed over and he ends his presence in the White House. The next president of the US will have to deal with the consequences."

2009 Iranian election controversy

In the aftermath of the disputed 2009 Iranian presidential election and the protests that followed, UK-Iran relations were further tested. On 19 June 2009, the Supreme Leader of Iran Ayatollah Khamenei described the British Government as the "most evil" of those in the Western nations, accusing the British government of sending spies into Iran to stir emotions at the time of the elections, although it has been suggested by British diplomats that the statement was using the UK as a "proxy" for the United States, in order to prevent damaging US–Iranian relations.  Nonetheless, the British Government, unhappy at the statement, summoned the Iranian ambassador Rasul Movaheddian to the Foreign Office to lodge a protest. Iran then proceeded to expel two British diplomats from the country, accusing them of "activities inconsistent with their diplomatic status". On 23 June 2009, the British Government responded, expelling two Iranian diplomats from the United Kingdom. Prime Minister Gordon Brown stated that he was unhappy at having to take the action, but suggested there was no option after what he described as 'unjustified' actions by Iran. On 24 June 2009, Iranian Foreign Minister Manouchehr Mottaki announced that the country was considering 'downgrading' its ties with the UK.

Four days later it was reported that Iranian authorities had arrested a number of British embassy staff in Tehran citing their "considerable role" in the recent unrest. After this event, the UK Government responded strongly demanding that the Iranian authorities release the British staff immediately as it stated that Iran's accusations are baseless without evidence. After the arrest of UK staff, the European Union (EU) has also demanded that UK staff be released in Iran under international law and if the UK staff are not released then the EU threatens a 'strong response'.  On December 29, 2009, Britain was warned by Iranian Foreign Minister Manouchehr Mottaki to state "Britain will get slapped in the mouth if it does not stop its nonsense."

The Queen's College, Oxford established the Neda Agha-Soltan Graduate Scholarship in 2009, named after Neda Agha-Soltan, who died in the protests that followed the election.  This led to a letter of protest to the college from the Iranian embassy in London, signed by the deputy ambassador, Safarali Eslamian. The letter disputed the circumstances of her death, and said that there was "supporting evidence indicating a pre-made scenario". Eslamain wrote, "It seems that the University of Oxford has stepped up involvement in a politically motivated campaign which is not only in sharp contract with its academic objectives, but also is linked with a chain of events in post-Iranian presidential elections blamed for British interference both at home and abroad".  The letter also said that the "decision to abuse Neda's case to establish a graduate scholarship will highly politicise your academic institution, undermining your scientific credibility—along with British press which made exceptionally a lot of hue and cry on Neda's death—will make Oxford at odd  with the rest of the world's academic institutions." Eslamain asked for the university's governing board to be informed of "the Iranian views", and finished by saying, "Surely, your steps to achieve your attractions through non-politically supported programs can better heal the wounds of her family and her nation."  Following publication of the Iranian letter, The Times was told by UK diplomatic sources, speaking anonymously, that the scholarship had put "another nail into the coffin" of relations between Britain and Iran.  If the government had been asked, the sources were reported as saying, it would have advised against the move, because it was felt that Iran would see it as an act of provocation, and because it would interfere with efforts to free Iranians working for the British Embassy in Tehran who had been detained for alleging participating in the post-election protests. A college spokesman said that the scholarship had not been set up as part of a political decision, and if the initial donations had been refused, this would have been interpreted as a political decision too.

2009 international arbitration court ruling
In April 2009 the British government lost its final appeal in the arbitration court of the International Chamber of Commerce at The Hague against a payment of $650 million to Iran. The money is compensation for an arms deal dating from the 1970s which then did not come about due to the occurrence of the Iranian Revolution. The Shah's government had ordered 1,500 Chieftain tanks and 250 Chieftain armoured recovery vehicles (ARVs) in a contract worth £650 million, but only 185 vehicles had been delivered before the revolution occurred. The contract also covered the provision of training to the Iranian army and the construction of a factory near Isfahan to build tank parts and ammunition. In order to recover some of the costs 279 of the Chieftains were sold to Jordan and 29 of the ARVs to Iraq, who used them against Iran in the Iran–Iraq War. The UK continued to deliver tank parts to Iran after the revolution but finally stopped following the outbreak of the Iranian hostage crisis in 1979.

The British government has itself confirmed it has to pay the money and the ruling, which originated in The Hague, received coverage in The Independent. Britain had already placed £486 million with the court in 2002 to pay for any ruling against it. The settlement is worth £390 million that will come out of this fund. Iran has yet to officially apply to receive the money but when it does so will not receive it, instead it will join £976 million of Iranian assets frozen by the UK due to EU sanctions.

2011 attack on the British Embassy

On 29 November 2011, despite heavy police resistance, two compounds of the British embassy in Tehran were stormed by Iranian protesters. The protesters smashed windows, ransacked offices, set fire to government documents, and burned a British flag.  Six British diplomats were initially reported by the Iranian semi-official news agency Mehr as being taken hostage, while later reports indicated that in fact they were escorted to safety by the police. The storming of the British embassy followed from the 2011 joint American-British-Canadian sanctions and the Iranian government's Guardian Council approving a parliamentary bill expelling the British ambassador as a result of those sanctions. A British flag was taken down and replaced by the Iranian flag by the protesters. The British Foreign Office responded by saying "We are outraged by this. It is utterly unacceptable and we condemn it." According to Iranian state news agencies, the protesters were largely composed of young adults. On 30 November William Hague announced that all Iranian diplomats had been expelled and given 48 hours to leave the United Kingdom.

Since 2011
The UK Defence Secretary Philip Hammond warned that Britain might take military action against Iran if it carries out its threat to block the Strait of Hormuz. He said any attempt by Iran to block the strategically important waterway in retaliation for sanctions against its oil exports would be “illegal and unsuccessful” and the Royal Navy would join any action to keep it open. British defence officials met US Secretary of Defense Leon Panetta on 6 January to criticize other members of the NATO for not being willing to commit resources to joint operations, including in Libya and Afghanistan. The following day, UK officials reported its intention to send its most powerful naval forces to the Persian Gulf to counter any Iranian attempt to close the Strait of Hormuz. The Type 45 destroyer  would arrive in the Gulf by the end of January. According to officials, the ship is capable of shooting down "any missile in Iran's armoury."

In July 2013, the UK considered opening better relations with Iran "step-by-step" following the election of President Hassan Rouhani, and in October of the same year, both countries announced that they would each appoint a chargé d'affaires to work toward resuming full diplomatic relations. This was done on 20 February 2014, and the British government announced in June 2014 that it would soon re-open its Tehran embassy. Embassies in each other's countries were simultaneously reopened in 2015. The ceremony in Tehran was attended by UK Foreign Secretary Philip Hammond, the first British Foreign Secretary to visit Iran since Jack Straw in 2003, who attended the reopening of the Iranian embassy in London, along with Iran's deputy foreign minister Mehdi Danesh Yazdi. Diplomat Ajay Sharma was named as the UK's charge d'affaires but a full ambassador was expected to be appointed in the coming months. In September 2016, both countries restored diplomatic relations to their pre-2011 level, with Nicholas Hopton being appointed British Ambassador in Tehran.

British Prime Minister David Cameron and Iranian President Hassan Rouhani met on the sidelines of a United Nations in September 2014, marking the highest-level direct contact between the two countries since the 1979 Islamic revolution.

In April 2016, an Iranian-British dual citizen Nazanin Zaghari-Ratcliffe was arrested while visiting Iran with her daughter. She was found guilty of "plotting to topple the Iranian government" in September 2016 and sentenced to 5 years in prison. Her husband led a concerted campaign to have her released maintaining that she "was imprisoned as leverage for a debt owed by the UK over its failure to deliver tanks to Iran in 1979." After her initial sentence expired in March 2021 she was charged and found guilty of propaganda activities against the government and sentenced to one year in prison. She was finally released on 16th March 2022, which was reported to be related to the UK paying a historic debt for tanks paid for by Iran in the 1970s but never delivered.

Theresa May, who succeeded Cameron as Prime Minister in July 2016, accused Iran of "aggressive regional actions" in the Middle East, including stirring trouble in Iraq, Lebanon and Syria, and this led to a deterioration in relations In response, Iran's Supreme Leader Ali Khamenei condemned Britain as a "source of evil and misery" for the Middle East.

The British intelligence officials concluded that Iran was responsible for a cyberattack on the British Parliament lasting 12 hours that compromised around 90 email accounts of MPs in June 2017.

On July 7, 2022, The Royal Navy of Britain reported that one of its warships had arrested smugglers in international waters south of Iran early this year after seizing Iranian armaments, including surface-to-air missiles and cruise missile engines.

Tanker detention and Strait of Hormuz tensions

On 4 July 2019, Royal Marines boarded the Iranian-owned tanker Grace 1 by helicopter off Gibraltar where it was detained. The reason given was to enforce European Union sanctions against Syrian entities, as the tanker was suspected of heading to Baniyas Refinery named in the sanctions that concern Syrian oil exports. Gibraltar had passed regulations permitting the detention the day before. Spain's Foreign Minister Josep Borrell stated that the detention was carried out at the request of the United States. An Iranian Foreign Ministry official called the seizure "piracy," stating that the UK does not have the right to implement sanctions against other nations "in an extraterritorial manner".

On 10 July 2019, tensions were raised further when boats belonging to Iran's Islamic Revolutionary Guard Corps approached a British Petroleum tanker, British Heritage, impeding it while it was transiting the Strait of Hormuz. The Royal Navy frigate  positioned themselves between the boats and ship so that it could continue its journey.

On 14 July 2019, British Foreign Secretary Jeremy Hunt said Grace 1 could be released if the UK received guarantees the oil — 2.1 million barrels worth — would not go to Syria.

On 19 July 2019, Iran media reported that the Swedish owned but British-flagged oil tanker Stena Impero had been seized by the Iranian Revolutionary Guard in the Strait of Hormuz. A first tanker, MV Mesdar, which was a Liberian-flagged vessel managed in the UK, jointly Algerian and Japanese owned, was boarded but later released. Iran stated that the British-flagged ship had collided with and damaged an Iranian vessel, and had ignored warnings by Iranian authorities. During the incident HMS Montrose was stationed too far away to offer timely assistance; when the Type 23 frigate arrived it was ten minutes too late.

On 15 August 2019 Gibraltar released Grace 1 after stating that it had received assurances she would not go to Syria. The Iranian government later stated that it had issued no assurances that the oil would not be delivered to Syria and reasserted its intention to continue supplying oil to the Arab nation. On 26 August, Iranian government spokesman Ali Rabiei announced that the 2.1 million barrels of crude had been sold to an unnamed buyer, in either Kalamata, Greece or Mersin, Turkey. A US court issued a warrant of seizure against the tanker because it was convinced that the tanker was owned by the IRGC, which is deemed by Washington a foreign terrorist organization.

On 15 August 2019 the UK's new Boris Johnson-led government agreed to join the U.S. in its Persian Gulf maritime security Operation Sentinel, abandoning the idea of a European-led naval protection force.

On 4 September 2019 Iran released seven of the 23 crew members of the British-flagged oil tanker Stena Impero, which the Iranian forces had detained in August. The Iranian Foreign Ministry spokesman Abbas Mousavi stated that they have been released on humanitarian grounds. He said that their problem was the violation committed by the ship. On 23 September, the Iranian authorities announced that the British-flagged tanker Stena Impero, which they had captured on July 19 in the Strait of Hormuz, was free to leave. According to the government spokesperson Ali Rabiei informed that the legal process concluded and all the conditions to let the oil tanker go were also fulfilled. However, on September 24, it was reported that despite raising a green signal for the British tanker to leave the port, it remained in Iran waters. Swedish owner of Stena Impero, Erik Hanell said that they had no idea why the tanker was still there. On 27 September, the Stena Impero departed from Iranian waters and made its way to Port Rashid in Dubai. All of the remaining crew members who were still detained by Iran were released as well. The ship was also able to transmit location signals before arriving at Port Rashid, Dubai, after which the remaining crew members started undergoing medical checkups. The same day, HMS Duncan returned to Portsmouth.

Detention of British Nationals

Following the release of dual British-Iranian Nationals of Anoosheh Ashoori and Nazanin Zaghari-Ratcliffe and furlough of tri-national Morad Tahbaz on 16 March 2022, Iran thenreturned Morad Tahbaz back to detention within two days. On 14 January 2023, Iran executed dual British-Iranian Alireza Akbari.

United kingdom sanctions on Iran 
In the beginning of 2023, the European Union along with Britian, had imposed sanctions on over 30 Iranian officials and organizations, including units of the revolutionary guards, due to their alleged involvement in human rights abuses during a crackdown on civil unrest. Iran had threatened retaliation.

See also 
 Iranians in the United Kingdom
 1979 Iranian Revolution conspiracy theory
 2007 Iranian seizure of Royal Navy personnel
 Anglo-Russian Convention of 1907
 Anglo-Soviet invasion of Iran
 Foreign relations of Iran
 Foreign relations of the United Kingdom
 Imperial Bank of Persia, a British-owned bank established in 1889.
 2011–12 Strait of Hormuz dispute
 British School of Tehran
 Old fox, a term used by Iranians to describe Britain.
 Bushire Under British Occupation

References

Further reading
 Bonakdarian, Mansour. Britain and the Iranian Constitutional Revolution 1906–1911. Syracuse University Press in association with the Iran Heritage Foundation. 2006. 
 Bullard, Reader.  Britain and the Middle East: From Earliest Times to 1963 (1964) popular history by a diplomat
 Galbraith, John S. "British policy on railways in Persia, 1870–1900." Middle Eastern Studies 25.4 (1989): 480-505 covers "Reuter Concession"; online
 Galbraith, John S. "Britain and American Railway Promoters in Late Nineteenth Century Persia." Albion 21.2 (1989): 248-262. online
 Greaves, Rose Louise. "British Policy in Persia, 1892-1903--I" Bulletin of the School of Oriental and African Studies, University of London 28#1 (1965), pp. 34–60 online
 Ingram, Edward. Britain’s Persian Connection 1798–1828: Prelude to the Great Game in Asia. 1993. Oxford University Press. 
 Kazemzadeh Firuz, Russia and Britain in Persia 1864–1914, A Study in Imperialism, 1968, Yale University Press.
 Sabahi, Houshang. British policy in Persia, 1918-1925 (Routledge, 2005).
 Shahnavaz, Shahbaz. Britain and South-West Persia 1880-1914: A Study in Imperialism and Economic Dependence (Routledge, 2005).
 Shuster, Morgan, The Strangling of Persia: Story of the European Diplomacy and Oriental Intrigue That Resulted in the Denationalization of Twelve Million Mohammedans. 
 Sykes, Christopher. "The Persian Crisis: Historical Background." History Today (July 1951) 1#7 pp 19–24 covers 1880 to 1944. 
 Thornton, A. P. "British Policy in Persia, 1858-1890." part I English Historical Review (1954) 70#274: 554-579 online. part III 70#274 (1955), pp. 55–71 online 
 Wilson, K. "Creative accounting: the place of loans to Persia in the commencement of the negotiation of the Anglo-Russian Convention of 1907." Middle Eastern Studies 38.2 (2002): 35-82.

External links

 BRITISH POLICY IN PERSIA, 1885-1892
 Iran-UK relation timeline: BBC
 UK-Iran relations - parstimes.com
 The British-Iranian Chamber of Commerce
 The Iran Society of London 
 The Irano-British Chamber of Commerce 
 Iran's Embassy in London
 The British Embassy in Tehran

 
United Kingdom
Bilateral relations of the United Kingdom